The Kuwaiti Emir Cup is an end of season cup competition involving teams from the Kuwaiti Premier League and the Kuwaiti Division One league.

The 2009 edition is the 46th to be held.

Al Arabi Kuwait is the current holders of the cup.

The winners qualify for the 2010 AFC Cup

First round

12 teams play a knockout tie. 6 clubs advance to the next round. Games played between 18 May and 21 May.

Quarter finals

Semi finals

Final

2009
2008–09 in Kuwaiti football
2008–09 domestic association football cups